Joseph Flinn Kilgrow (August 30, 1917 – July 21, 1967) was a college football player and coach.

Early years
Kilgrow was born August 30, 1917 in Montgomery, Alabama. He attended Sidney Lanier High School.

University of Alabama
Kilgrow was a prominent halfback for the Alabama Crimson Tide football team of the University of Alabama.

1937

Kilgrow was selected a first-team All-American by the International News Service     .  In 1938 he finished 5th in the Heisman voting.

Coaching career
He coached the backfield of the freshman team at his alma mater and the varsity backfield at Mercer before his career was interrupted by the war. He was inducted into the Alabama Sports Hall of Fame in 1989.

References

1917 births
1967 deaths
All-American college football players
American football halfbacks
Alabama Crimson Tide football players
Alabama Crimson Tide football coaches
Mercer Bears football coaches
Players of American football from Montgomery, Alabama
Sportspeople from Montgomery, Alabama